Handball has been a Pan Arab Games event since the third edition in 1961 in Casablanca, Morocco.

Men's tournaments

Summaries 

 A round-robin tournament determined the final standings.

Women's tournaments

Summaries 

 A round-robin tournament determined the final standings.

Participating nations 

*

References

External links 
 Handball at the Pan Arab Games - goalzz.com
Egypt Honnor

 
Pan Arab Games
Sports at the Pan Arab Games
Pan Arab Games